Malcolm U. Pitt Field is a baseball venue located on the campus of the University of Richmond in Richmond, Virginia, United States.  The field is home to the Richmond Spiders baseball team of the NCAA Division I Atlantic 10 Conference.  The field is named after former Spiders baseball and basketball coach Malcolm U. Pitt.  It has a capacity of 600 people.

The field, located next to Westhampton Lake on the Richmond campus, is surfaced with synthetic turf, which was installed in 2015.  Renovations prior to the 2008 season included the addition of a new scoreboard and sound system.  Other features of the facility include an outfield drainage system, bullpen, batting cages, and a press box.

See also
 List of NCAA Division I baseball venues

References

College baseball venues in the United States
Sports venues in Richmond, Virginia
Richmond Spiders baseball
Baseball venues in Virginia